Olga Petrova (born Muriel Harding; 10 May 1884 – 30 November 1977) was a British-American actress, screenwriter and playwright.

Life and career

Born Muriel Harding in England, she moved to the United States and became a star of vaudeville using the stage name Olga Petrova. She starred in a number of films for Solax Studios and Metro Pictures, where she was usually given the role of a femme fatale. During her seven years in film, Petrova appeared in more than two dozen films and wrote the script for several others. Most of her films are now lost, including what she considered her best pictures, those directed by Maurice Tourneur. The Library of Congress Silent Feature Film Database indicates three of her films survive: The Vampire (1915), Extravagance (1916) and The Waiting Soul (1918).

In 1913, she met local physician John Dillon Stewart in Indianapolis, Indiana, and quickly became engaged to be married. They married March 31 in Kansas City. Stewart moved his practice to New York City to be near her primary base of operations.

Petrova left the film industry in 1918 but continued to act in Broadway productions. During the 1920s, she wrote three plays and toured the U.S. with a theater troupe. She also interviewed a number of prominent film stars on paid assignment for Shadowland magazine, Motion Picture Magazine, and Photoplay Journal, including Marion Davies, Mary Pickford, Theda Bara, Alla Nazimova, Norma Talmadge, Charlie Chaplin, Douglas Fairbanks, Sr., and Rudolf Valentino. In 1942, she published her autobiography Butter with My Bread. She has a star on the Hollywood Walk of Fame.

She made several visits to Saranac Lake, New York at the height of her fame at the request of theatrical agent William Morris. In the summer of 1921, she turned the first shovel of earth for a housing project sponsored by the chamber of commerce at a lot on Lake Street donated by Walter Jenkins.  The Petrova School on Petrova Avenue bears her name.

Olga Petrova died in 1977 in Clearwater, Florida, aged 93. She had no children.

Publications 
 The White Peacock: A Play in Three Acts (Boston: Four Seas Company, 1922)
 Hurricane: Four Episodes in the Story of a Life (Boston: Four Seas Company, 1924)
 What Do We Know?: A Drama in Three Acts (Boston: Four Seas Company, 1930)
 Butter with My Bread (New York: Bobbs-Merrill, 1942)

Filmography 

Departure of a Grand Old Man (1912)
The Tigress (1914)
The Heart of a Painted Woman (1915)
The Vampire (1915)
The Bludgeon (1915)
My Madonna (1915)
What Will People Say? (1916)
The Soul Market (1916)
Playing With Fire (1916)
The Scarlet Woman (1916)
The Eternal Question (1916)
Extravagance (1916 Metro Pictures)
The Black Butterfly (1916 Metro Pictures)
Bridges Burned (1917 Metro Pictures)
The Secret of Eve (1917 Metro Pictures)
The Waiting Soul (1917 Metro Pictures)
The Soul of a Magdalen (1917 Metro Pictures)
The Undying Flame (1917 Paramount)Maurice Tourneur, director
Law of the Land (1917 Paramount Pictures) Maurice Tourneur, director
To the Death (1917 Metro Pictures)
The Silence Sellers (1917 Metro Pictures)
Exile (1917 Paramount Pictures)Maurice Tourneur, director
More Truth Than Poetry (1917 Metro Pictures)
Daughter of Destiny (1917 First National Pictures) also producer and writer
The Light Within (1918 First National Pictures)
The Life Mask (1918 First National)
Tempered Steel (1918 First National Pictures)
The Panther Woman (1918 First National Pictures)
Kira Kiralina (1928)

References

External links

Olga Petrova at the Women Film Pioneers Project
Images of Olga Petrova, held by the Billy Rose Theatre Division, New York Public Library for the Performing Arts
portrait gallery(University of Washington, Sayre collection)
Paramount performer slide 
Olga Petrova(kinotv)

1884 births
1977 deaths
Vaudeville performers
American silent film actresses
20th-century American actresses
British silent film actresses
British stage actresses
British emigrants to the United States
20th-century British actresses
British women dramatists and playwrights
20th-century British dramatists and playwrights
20th-century British women writers
Women film pioneers